This is a chronological list of snooker minor-ranking tournaments. Ranking tournaments are those that are used for the official system of ranking professional snooker players which is used to determine automatic qualification and seeding for tournaments on the World Snooker Tour. However, in 1992/93 and from 2010/11 to the 2015/16 season there were a number of tournaments which contributed to the world rankings but at a lower rate than standard ranking tournaments. These tournaments are referred to as "minor-ranking tournaments". All the minor-ranking tournaments from 2010 to 2016 were part of the Players Tour Championship. These events are the events included in the list below.

Winners

Mark Selby had the most wins, 7, in minor-rankings events. Mark Allen was second with 5 wins.

Tournaments
Source:

MR – minor-ranking event number. Date – date of the final day of the tournament. Numbers in brackets in the Winner and Losing finalist columns refer to the number of times the player had been a winner or losing finalist at that time.

Many of the Players Tour Championship tournaments had alternative names. For instance the Euro Players Tour Championship 2010/2011 – Event 2 was also called the 2010 Brugge Open. For three events (M28, M35, M41) only the later stages of the event were held at the venue noted, earlier rounds being held in Sheffield.

See also
 List of snooker ranking tournaments
 Snooker world rankings

References

 
Minor-ranking tournaments
Minor-ranking tournaments